Frederick Ludwig Herzog (1925–1995) was an American systematic theologian at Duke University and minister of the United Church of Christ. An impassioned champion of civil rights, his academic focus was liberation theology.

Life 
Herzog was born on November 29, 1925, in Ashley, North Dakota. He earned his doctorate from Princeton University in 1953 under the supervision of  after having studied in Germany and Switzerland, where he was an assistant to the theologian Karl Barth. He was ordained to the ministry of the United Church of Christ, the successor to the German Reformed denomination of his childhood.  In 1960, he joined the faculty at Duke Divinity School. Herzog taught Christian theology at Duke until his sudden death during a faculty meeting on October 9, 1995. In the spring of 1970, he wrote the first North American article by a white theologian on liberation theology, following James Cone's Black Theology and Black Power published in 1969, and in 1972 his Liberation Theology was published. In Justice Church Herzog extended his methodology for liberation theology in North America. During the final ten years of his life, his writings were strongly affected by his work in Latin America, especially Peru where he assisted with the support of a Methodist-related seminary, the cause of which he was championing at the moment of his death.

His daughter, Dagmar Herzog, is professor of history at the CUNY Graduate Center in New York City.

Published works 
Herzog, F. Liberation Theology
Herzog, F. European Pietism Reviewed
Herzog, F. Justice Church
Herzog, F. God-Walk - Liberation Shaping Dogmatics
Two books have been published referring to his work: 
Theology & Corporate Conscience: Essays in Honor of Frederick Herzog (ed by MD Meeks, J Moltmann, FR Trost)
Theology from the Belly of the Whale: A Frederick Herzog Reader (ed by Joerg Rieger)
The Duke University Libraries has a collection of his papers:
Guide to the Frederick Herzog Papers, 1947-2011 and undated (bulk 1947-1995)

Pertinent Articles:  
Religion-online.org

References

Bibliography 

 
 
 
 
 

1925 births
1995 deaths
20th-century American male writers
20th-century American theologians
Academics from North Dakota
American Christian theologians
American male non-fiction writers
American people of German descent
Christians from North Carolina
Christians from North Dakota
Duke Divinity School faculty
Liberation theologians
People from McIntosh County, North Dakota
Princeton University alumni
Religious leaders from North Carolina
Religious leaders from North Dakota
Seminary academics
United Church of Christ ministers
20th-century American clergy